The 2005 Oregon State Beavers baseball team represented Oregon State University in the 2005 NCAA Division I baseball season. The Beavers played their home games at Goss Stadium at Coleman Field. The team was coached by Pat Casey in his 11th year at Oregon State.

The Beavers won the Corvallis Regional and Super Regional to advanced to the College World Series, where they were defeated by the Baylor Bears.

Roster

Schedule 

! style="" | Regular Season
|- valign="top" 

|- align="center" bgcolor="#ccffcc"
| 1 || February 3 || vs  || Packard Stadium • Tempe, Arizona || 19–0 || 1–0 || –
|- align="center" bgcolor="#ffcccc"
| 2 || February 4 || vs  || Packard Stadium • Tempe, Arizona || 1–3 || 1–1 || –
|- align="center" bgcolor="#ccffcc"
| 3 || February 5 || vs New Mexico State || Packard Stadium • Tempe, Arizona || 11–2 || 2–1 || –
|- align="center" bgcolor="#ccffcc"
| 4 || February 6 || at Arizona State || Packard Stadium • Tempe, Arizona || 12–6 || 3–1 || –
|- align="center" bgcolor="#ccffcc"
| 5 || February 15 ||  || Goss Stadium at Coleman Field • Corvallis, Oregon || 6–4 || 4–1 || –
|- align="center" bgcolor="#ccffcc"
| 6 || February 19 || vs  || John Cunningham Stadium • San Diego, California || 8–0 || 5–1 || –
|- align="center" bgcolor="#ccffcc"
| 7 || February 20 || at  || John Cunningham Stadium • San Diego, California || 3–2 || 6–1 || –
|- align="center" bgcolor="#ccffcc"
| 8 || February 25 || at  || Caesar Uyesaka Stadium • Santa Barbara, California || 4–2 || 7–1 || –
|- align="center" bgcolor="#ccffcc"
| 9 || February 26 || at UC Santa Barbara || Caesar Uyesaka Stadium • Santa Barbara, California || 6–4 || 8–1 || –
|- align="center" bgcolor="#ccffcc"
| 10 || February 27 || at UC Santa Barbara || Caesar Uyesaka Stadium • Santa Barbara, California || 5–3 || 9–1 || –
|-

|- align="center" bgcolor="#ffcccc"
| 11 || March 4 ||  || Goss Stadium at Coleman Field • Corvallis, Oregon || 2–3 || 9–2 || –
|- align="center" bgcolor="#ccffcc"
| 12 || March 5 || UC Riverside || Goss Stadium at Coleman Field • Corvallis, Oregon || 5–2 || 10–2 || –
|- align="center" bgcolor="#ccffcc"
| 13 || March 6 || UC Riverside || Goss Stadium at Coleman Field • Corvallis, Oregon || 7–2 || 11–2 || –
|- align="center" bgcolor="#ccffcc"
| 14 || March 11 || vs  || Eddy D. Field Stadium • Malibu, California || 4–1 || 12–2 || –
|- align="center" bgcolor="#ffcccc"
| 15 || March 12 || at  || Eddy D. Field Stadium • Malibu, California || 4–9 || 12–3 || –
|- align="center" bgcolor="#ccffcc"
| 16 || March 13 || vs  || Eddy D. Field Stadium • Malibu, California || 8–2 || 13–3 || –
|- align="center" bgcolor="#ccffcc"
| 17 || March 18 ||  || Goss Stadium at Coleman Field • Corvallis, Oregon || 8–2 || 14–3 || –
|- align="center" bgcolor="#ccffcc"
| 18 || March 18 || Sacramento State || Goss Stadium at Coleman Field • Corvallis, Oregon || 7–4 || 15–3 || –
|- align="center" bgcolor="#ccffcc"
| 19 || March 19 || Sacramento State || Goss Stadium at Coleman Field • Corvallis, Oregon || 9–3 || 16–3 || –
|- align="center" bgcolor="#ccffcc"
| 20 || March 22 || at Portland || Joe Etzel Field • Portland, Oregon || 9–3 || 17–3 || –
|- align="center" bgcolor="#ffcccc"
| 21 || March 24 ||  || Goss Stadium at Coleman Field • Corvallis, Oregon || 7–17 || 17–4 || –
|- align="center" bgcolor="#ccffcc"
| 22 || March 25 || Dallas Baptist || Goss Stadium at Coleman Field • Corvallis, Oregon || 7–2 || 18–4 || –
|- align="center" bgcolor="#ccffcc"
| 23 || March 25 || Dallas Baptist || Goss Stadium at Coleman Field • Corvallis, Oregon || 11–3 || 19–4 || –
|- align="center" bgcolor="#ccffcc"
| 24 || March 28 ||  || Goss Stadium at Coleman Field • Corvallis, Oregon || 12–5 || 20–4 || –
|- align="center" bgcolor="#ccffcc"
| 25 || March 29 || BYU || Goss Stadium at Coleman Field • Corvallis, Oregon || 11–6 || 21–4 || –
|-

|- align="center" bgcolor="#ccffcc"
| 26 || April 1 ||  || Goss Stadium at Coleman Field • Corvallis, Oregon || 11–1 || 22–4 || 1–0
|- align="center" bgcolor="#ccffcc"
| 27 || April 2 || California || Goss Stadium at Coleman Field • Corvallis, Oregon || 5–2 || 23–4 || 2–0
|- align="center" bgcolor="#ccffcc"
| 28 || April 3 || California || Goss Stadium at Coleman Field • Corvallis, Oregon || 4–2 || 24–4 || 3–0
|- align="center" bgcolor="#ccffcc"
| 29 || April 9 || at  || Sunken Diamond • Stanford, California || 9–7 || 25–4 || 4–0
|- align="center" bgcolor="#ccffcc"
| 30 || April 9 || at Stanford || Sunken Diamond • Stanford, California || 11–10 || 26–4 || 5–0
|- align="center" bgcolor="#ffcccc"
| 31 || April 10 || at Stanford || Sunken Diamond • Stanford, California || 3–4 || 26–5 || 5–1
|- align="center" bgcolor="#ffcccc"
| 32 || April 15 || at Arizona || Jerry Kindall Field at Frank Sancet Stadium • Tucson, Arizona || 5–7 || 26–6 || 5–2
|- align="center" bgcolor="#ccffcc"
| 33 || April 16 || at Arizona || Jerry Kindall Field at Frank Sancet Stadium • Tucson, Arizona || 17–1 || 27–6 || 6–2
|- align="center" bgcolor="#ffcccc"
| 34 || April 17 || at Arizona || Jerry Kindall Field at Frank Sancet Stadium • Tucson, Arizona || 6–7 || 27–7 || 6–3
|- align="center" bgcolor="#ccffcc"
| 35 || April 22 ||  || Goss Stadium at Coleman Field • Corvallis, Oregon || 5–4 || 28–7 || 7–3
|- align="center" bgcolor="#ccffcc"
| 36 || April 24 || Washington State || Goss Stadium at Coleman Field • Corvallis, Oregon || 8–1 || 29–7 || 8–3
|- align="center" bgcolor="#ccffcc"
| 37 || April 24 || Washington State || Goss Stadium at Coleman Field • Corvallis, Oregon || 7–6 || 30–7 || 9–3
|- align="center" bgcolor="#ccffcc"
| 38 || April 29 || Arizona State || Goss Stadium at Coleman Field • Corvallis, Oregon || 6–5 || 31–7 || 10–3
|- align="center" bgcolor="#ffcccc"
| 39 || April 30 || Arizona State || Goss Stadium at Coleman Field • Corvallis, Oregon || 1–3 || 31–8 || 10–4
|-

|- align="center" bgcolor="#ccffcc"
| 40 || May 1 || Arizona State || Goss Stadium at Coleman Field • Corvallis, Oregon || 5–1 || 32–8 || 11–4
|- align="center" bgcolor="#ccffcc"
| 41 || May 3 || Portland || Goss Stadium at Coleman Field • Corvallis, Oregon || 6–2 || 33–8 || 11–4
|- align="center" bgcolor="#ccffcc"
| 42 || May 6 || at  || Jackie Robinson Stadium • Los Angeles, California || 3–1 || 34–8 || 12–4
|- align="center" bgcolor="#ccffcc"
| 43 || May 7 || at UCLA || Jackie Robinson Stadium • Los Angeles, California || 10–4 || 35–8 || 13–4
|- align="center" bgcolor="#ccffcc"
| 44 || May 8 || at UCLA || Jackie Robinson Stadium • Los Angeles, California || 16–3 || 36–8 || 14–4
|- align="center" bgcolor="#ccffcc"
| 45 || May 13 || at  || Husky Ballpark • Seattle, Washington || 7–0 || 37–8 || 15–4
|- align="center" bgcolor="#ccffcc"
| 46 || May 14 || at Washington || Husky Ballpark • Seattle, Washington || 7–4 || 38–8 || 16–4
|- align="center" bgcolor="#ccffcc"
| 47 || May 15 || at Washington || Husky Ballpark • Seattle, Washington || 3–1 || 39–8 || 17–4
|- align="center" bgcolor="#ccffcc"
| 48 || May 20 ||  || Goss Stadium at Coleman Field • Corvallis, Oregon || 5–4 || 40–8 || 18–4
|- align="center" bgcolor="#ccffcc"
| 49 || May 21 || Southern California || Goss Stadium at Coleman Field • Corvallis, Oregon || 10–7 || 41–8 || 19–4
|- align="center" bgcolor="#ffcccc"
| 50 || May 22 || Southern California || Goss Stadium at Coleman Field • Corvallis, Oregon || 2–12 || 41–9 || 19–5
|-

|-
|-
! style="" | Postseason
|- valign="top"

|- align="center" bgcolor="#ccffcc"
| 51 || June 3 ||  || Goss Stadium at Coleman Field • Corvallis, Oregon || 4–3 || 42–9 || 19–5
|- align="center" bgcolor="#ccffcc"
| 52 || June 4 ||  || Goss Stadium at Coleman Field • Corvallis, Oregon || 11–1 || 43–9 || 19–5
|- align="center" bgcolor="#ccffcc"
| 53 || June 5 || St. John's || Goss Stadium at Coleman Field • Corvallis, Oregon || 19–3 || 44–9 || 19–5
|-

|- align="center" bgcolor="#ccffcc"
| 54 || June 11 || Southern California || Goss Stadium at Coleman Field • Corvallis, Oregon || 10–4 || 45–9 || 19–5
|- align="center" bgcolor="#ffcccc"
| 55 || June 12 || Southern California || Goss Stadium at Coleman Field • Corvallis, Oregon || 8–9 || 45–10 || 19–5
|- align="center" bgcolor="#ccffcc"
| 56 || June 13 || Southern California || Goss Stadium at Coleman Field • Corvallis, Oregon || 10–8 || 46–10 || 19–5
|-

|- align="center" bgcolor="#ffcccc"
| 57 || June 18 || vs  || Johnny Rosenblatt Stadium • Omaha, Nebraska || 1–3 || 46–11 || 19–5
|- align="center" bgcolor="#ffcccc"
| 58 || June 20 || vs Baylor || Johnny Rosenblatt Stadium • Omaha, Nebraska || 3–4 || 46–12 || 19–5
|-

Awards and honors 
Darwin Barney
 First Team All-Pac-10
 Pacific-10 Conference Freshman of the Year
 First Team Freshman All-American Collegiate Baseball

Dallas Buck
 First Team All-Pac-10
 First Team All-American American Baseball Coaches Association
 First Team All-American Baseball America
 First Team All-American Collegiate Baseball
 Second Team All-American National Collegiate Baseball Writers Association
 First Team All-American USA Today Sports Weekly

Jacoby Ellsbury
 First Team All-Pac-10
 Pacific-10 Conference Player of the Year
 First Team All-American American Baseball Coaches Association
 First Team All-American Baseball America
 Second Team All-American Collegiate Baseball
 First Team All-American National Collegiate Baseball Writers Association
 First Team All-American USA Today Sports Weekly

Nate Fogle
 Honorable Mention All-Pac-10

Ryan Gipson
 Honorable Mention All-Pac-10

Tyler Graham
 Honorable Mention All-Pac-10

Kevin Gunderson
 First Team All-Pac-10

Andy Jenkins
 First Team All-Pac-10

Anton Maxwell
 Honorable Mention All-Pac-10

Shea McFeely
 Honorable Mention All-Pac-10

Jonah Nickerson
 First Team All-Pac-10
 Second Team All-American USA Today Sports Weekly

References 

Oregon State Beavers baseball seasons
Oregon State Beavers baseball
College World Series seasons
Oregon State
Pac-12 Conference baseball champion seasons